Bechem is a town and is the capital of Tano South district of the Ahafo of Ghana, and Bechem is the district capital for the Tano South Constituency. Bechem is located close to the capital town of Bono, Sunyani. The town is known for the Bechem Presbyterian Secondary School. The school is a second cycle institution. The town has one of the best teacher training colleges in the country known as St. Joseph college (JOSCO) and it has two villages known to be Techimantia and Derma which both stand tall when it comes to tomato production in the country.

It is the home of Bechem United Football Club who currently  play in the top division in Ghana.

References

Populated places in the Ahafo Region